Flax sulawesii is a moth of the family Erebidae first described by Michael Fibiger in 2011. It is found in Indonesia (it was described from North Sulawesi).

The wingspan is about 11 mm. The forewings including fringes are light brown. The base of the costa is dark brown and there is a dark-brown quadrangular patch in the upper medial area. The crosslines are indistinct brown, outlined in beige, except the terminal line which is indicated by dark-brown interveinal dots. The hindwings are grey. The underside of the forewings is unicolorous brown and the underside of the hindwings is grey with a discal spot.

References

Micronoctuini
Moths described in 2011
Taxa named by Michael Fibiger